Mostafa Zamani (20 June 1982) is an Iranian actor. He has received various accolades, including a Hafez Award and two Iran Cinema Celebration Awards, in addition to nominations for a Crystal Simorgh and an Iran's Film Critics and Writers Association Award.

Early life
His father is from Mazandran, and his mother is from Gilan. He lived in Gilan with his family. When he turned 7, they moved to Fereydunkenar Mazandaran Province. He is famous for many roles in Iran's film industry, but his memorable acting as Yousef in the Iranian TV series, "Yousef Nabi" (prophet joseph) was the beginning of his stardom.

Career
Zamani made his series debut in 2008 with Prophet Joseph, and cinematic debut in 2009 with Aul.

He has acted in several series, such as In the Eye of the Storm (2003–2009) and Shahrzad (2015–2018).

Since then, he has appeared in several movies, including Farewell Baghdad (2009), Retribution (2009), Parya's Story (2010), Parinaz (2010), The Final Whistle (2010), A Simple Romance (2011), The Queen (2011), I'm Her Spouse (2011), Berlin 7 (2011), Mirror and Candlestick (2012) and The Exclusive Line (2013).

Filmography

Film 
Sara and Ayda (2017) as Saeed 
A Special Day (2016) as Hamid 
Take Off (2015)
A Persian Melody (2015) as Mahmud 
Small Black Fish (2014) as Maziyar 
Special Line (2014) as Fereydoun Doulabi 
Twenty Weeks (2013) as Ahmad 
Mirror Shmdvn (2013)
Berlin -7 (2012) as Behrouz 
South Street Thief (2012) as Kavih 
I am his wife (2012) as Amir Husayn 
My Father Love Story (2012)
Queen (2012) as Jamshid 
A Simple Love Story (2011) as Ali 
Fairy Tail (2011) as Siyavash Masroor
Final Whistle (2011)
Parinaz (2011) as Davud 
Farewell Baghdad (2010) as Saleh al-Marzouk 
Booye Gandom (2010) as Inja Tarik Nisht 
Aal (2010) as Sina 
Paria Story (2009)
Penalty (2009)
Goodbye Baghdad (2009) as Saleh al-Marzouk

Web

Television

References

External links

Mostafa Zamani on whatsupiran.com
 Mostafa Zamani on IMDb

1982 births
Living people
Iranian male film actors
Islamic Azad University alumni
Iranian male television actors
People from Mazandaran Province